Colin Murphy may refer to:

 Colin Murphy (comedian) (born 1968), Irish comedian
 Colin Murphy (ice hockey) (born 1980), Canadian ice hockey player
 Colin Murphy (footballer, born 1950), English football (soccer) player and manager
 Colin Murphy (footballer, born 1991), New Zealand football (soccer) player
 Colin Murphy (Days of Our Lives), character on soap opera Days of our Lives